Shrichand Bajaj (1 October 1933 – 20 July 2005) was an Indian swimmer. He competed in the men's 100 metre freestyle at the 1956 Summer Olympics.

References

External links
 

1933 births
2005 deaths
Swimmers from Mumbai
Olympic swimmers of India
Swimmers at the 1956 Summer Olympics
Indian male freestyle swimmers